Vanden Plas is the name of coachbuilders who produced bodies for specialist and up-market automobile manufacturers. Latterly the name became a top-end luxury model designation for cars from subsidiaries of British Leyland and the Rover Group, it was last used in 2009 to denote the top-luxury version of the Jaguar XJ (X350).

Belgium and England

Batched and bespoke coachwork
The business began in 1870 in Brussels, Belgium, initially making axles later producing horse-drawn carriages. It was founded by Guillaume van den Plas, a blacksmith, and his three sons, Antoine, Henri and Willy, who later set up a branch in Paris. Guillaume's surname is Dutch meaning "from the lake".  In 1884 they moved from Brussels to Antwerp. With increased business they opened a branch in Brussels again in 1890. By 1900, they worked with De Dion Bouton, Berlier, Germain and Packard. By 1908 Carrosserie Van den Plas had a workforce of 400 men producing 300 special bodies a year, and that soon increased to over 750. The French branch ceased production in 1934 while the Belgian business was active until 1949.

The coachbuilder's name first appeared in the United Kingdom in 1906 when Métallurgique cars were imported with Carrosserie Van den Plas coachwork. The first Vanden Plas company in England was established by Warwick Wright (now Peugeot dealers) in 1913, building bodies under license from Carrosserie Van den Plas Belgium.

During the First World War UK activities were switched to aircraft production, and the UK business was bought by The Aircraft Manufacturing Company which was based at Hendon near London. In 1917, Vanden Plas (1917) Ltd. was incorporated. After the war it seems to have been a struggle to get back into coachbuilding and in 1922 that company was placed in receivership. The exclusive UK naming rights seem to have been lost, because in the early 1920s the Belgian firm was exhibiting at the London Motor Show alongside the British business. In 1923 the rights to the name and the goodwill were purchased by the Fox brothers, who incorporated Vanden Plas (England) 1923 Limited. They moved the business from Hendon to Kingsbury and built on the contacts that had been made with Bentley. Between 1924 and 1931, when Bentley failed, Vanden Plas built the bodies for more than 700 of their chassis.

In the 1930s the company became less dependent on one car maker, and supplied coachwork to such as Alvis, Armstrong Siddeley, Bentley, Daimler, Lagonda, Rolls-Royce and Talbot. The company also updated its production methods and took to making small batches of similar bodies. With the outbreak of war in 1939, coachbuilding stopped and the company returned to aircraft work, manufacturing the wooden framework for the de Havilland Mosquito, one of the most successful aircraft of the Second World War. After the war, the company continued its association with de Havilland, and manufactured parts for the Vampire jet fighter.

Production limousines

Princess

With peace in 1945, the company looked to restart its old business when a new customer came along. Austin wanted to market a chauffeur-driven version of its in-house-built large 4-litre Rolls-Royce-size A110 Sheerline luxury car and approached Vanden Plas. Vanden Plas became a subsidiary of the Austin Motor Company in 1946 and produced Austin's A120 Princess model on the Austin Sheerline chassis.

From 1958, this began to involve chassis assembly and Austin, now BMC, recognised Vanden Plas as a motor manufacturer in its own right by dropping Austin from the name and so enabled Nuffield dealers to sell the Princess. In 1960, the Princess became the Vanden Plas Princess.

Daimler DS 420

Austin was joined in BMC by Jaguar with its new subsidiary Daimler. Production of Princess limousines ended in 1968 when they were replaced with Daimler DS420 limousines (Jaguar had acquired Daimler in 1960) built by Vanden Plas on a lengthened Jaguar Mark X platform. The DS420 was produced at the Kingsbury Lane Vanden Plas factory until it closed in November 1979.

The British Leyland overall holding company board decided in 1967 there were insufficient funds in the group advertising budget to cope with marketing in North America the Daimler brand as well as Jaguar. This decision was later changed but Vanden Plas is used in North America instead of Daimler on Jaguar's top luxury models. Ownership of the Vanden Plas name stayed with the Rover Group so when Rover was sold Jaguar was obliged to stop using Vanden Plas in the United Kingdom though it continues to do so in America. Within the UK a Daimler Double-Six Vanden Plas became a plain Daimler Double-Six.

Badge engineering

Also in 1957/8, Vanden Plas were asked by Leonard Lord to add luxury fittings to a batch of Austin A105 Westminster cars, beginning the practice of using the company's skills and name for badge-engineered (and modified) luxury versions of many of the BMC (and later British Leyland (BL)) cars such as the 1100/1300 range and the Allegro (known as the Vanden Plas 1500, 1.5 & 1.7 from 1975 to 1980). The Vanden Plas works in Kingsbury, North London closed in 1979 and the marque switched to Abingdon.

From 1982 to 1989, Austin Rover made upmarket Vanden Plas models within its Metro, Maestro, Montego and Rover SD1  and SD3 ranges.

The name is also used in North America on Jaguar cars otherwise branded Daimler in other markets between 1982-2008.

In 1992, a Japanese company recreated the Vanden Plas 1100/1300 look on the Nissan Micra K11.  This involved replicating the front and rear of the Vanden Plas, complete with two tone paint scheme as sported by the original model in the 1960s.

The last UK market British car to bear the Vanden Plas name was the Rover 75 at the beginning of the 21st century.

China
The rights to the design of the Rover 75 cars and the MG Group (which had formerly been MG Rover) were purchased by a Chinese firm, Nanjing Automobile. Ford purchased the Rover name from the Rover Group's previous owner BMW to protect the Land Rover brand from Shanghai Automotive, who wanted the Rover name for their 75-based car (Ford was at this time owner of Land Rover and Jaguar). The Vanden Plas name (for outside North America) and many other Leyland names were purchased by Nanjing Automobile.

See also
Austin Sheerline
Austin Princess
 List of car manufacturers of the United Kingdom
 Vanden Plas Owners Club

References

Cited in text

General
 Vanden Plas history & models at "The unofficial Austin Rover resource"

External links

Austin Memories
The Cambridge-Oxford Owners Club

Rover Company
Coachbuilders of the United Kingdom
Vehicle manufacture in London
History of the London Borough of Brent